Hugh "Jazzer" Byrne (1904–1983) was an Australian rugby league footballer who played in the 1920s and 1930s.

Born on 28 April 1904 at Woollahra, New South Wales, Byrne became a large, striding winger. Byrne played for Eastern Suburbs (1925–1928 and 1930) and South Sydney (1932–33).

In 1928 Byrne was selected to represent Australia in a test match against England. 

Byrne died on 22 December 1983, aged 79.

References

Australian rugby league players
Sydney Roosters players
South Sydney Rabbitohs players
Australia national rugby league team players
1904 births
1983 deaths
Rugby league players from Sydney